Michael Heinloth (born 9 February 1992) is a German professional footballer who plays as a right-back.

Club career 
Heinloth joined SC Paderborn 07 in 2014 from 1. FC Nürnberg. He made his Bundesliga debut at 20 September 2014 against Hannover 96 in a 2–0 home win. He played the first 71 minutes, before being substituted by Stefan Kutschke.

On 18 July 2016, he signed a two-year contract at NEC Nijmegen.

On 20 July 2018, he signed a year contract at Zagłębie Sosnowiec. He made his debut in an Ekstraklasa match against Zagłębie Lubin on 3 October 2018.

References

External links
 
 

Living people
1992 births
German footballers
Association football fullbacks
Bundesliga players
2. Bundesliga players
3. Liga players
Eredivisie players
SC Paderborn 07 players
1. FC Nürnberg II players
NEC Nijmegen players
Zagłębie Sosnowiec players
FC Ingolstadt 04 players
German expatriate footballers
German expatriate sportspeople in the Netherlands
Expatriate footballers in the Netherlands
German expatriate sportspeople in Poland
Expatriate footballers in Poland